was a Japanese academic, psychoanalyst and author.

Early life
Doi was born in Tokyo, Japan in 1920.  He was a graduate of the University of Tokyo.

Career
Doi was Professor Emeritus in the Department of Neuropsychiatry at the University of Tokyo and a medical adviser to St. Luke's International Hospital in Tokyo. He was also Director of the National Institute of Mental Health in Japan. He taught at the University of Tokyo (1971-1980) and at International Christian University (1980-1982). He wrote numerous books and articles both in Japanese and in English.

Doi was best known for his influential explanation of contemporary Japanese society in the work The Anatomy of Dependence, published in 1971, which focused extensively on —inner feelings and behaviors that show individual's innate desires to be understood and taken care of—as a psychoanalytical concept and theory. The Anatomy of Dependence was described by Harvard professor emeritus Ezra Vogel as "the first book by a Japanese trained in psychiatry to have an impact on Western psychiatric thinking." Others critiqued Doi's theories as merely a variety of nihonjinron.

Doi died aged 89 in 2009.

Publications
 Doi, T. (1956). Japanese language as an expression of Japanese psychology. Western Speech, 20(2), 90-96. 
 Doi, T. (1967). : An interpretation. In R. P. Dore (Ed.), Aspects of social change in modern Japan (pp. 327–336). Princeton, NJ: Princeton University Press.
 Doi, T. (1973).  and : Concepts derived from the Japanese two-fold structure of consciousness. Journal of Nervous and Mental Disease, 157(4), 258-261.
 Doi, T. (1973). The anatomy of dependence: The key analysis of Japanese behavior (J. Bester, Trans.). Tokyo: Kodansha International.
 Doi, T. (1973). Quarterly Journal of Speech, 59(2), 180-185. 
 Doi, T. (1976). The psychological world of Natsume Soseki (W. J. Taylor, Trans.). Cambridge, MA: East Asian Research Center, Harvard University.
 Doi, T. (1986). : A key concept for understanding Japanese personality structure. In T. S. Lebra & W. P. Lebra (Eds.), Japanese culture and behavior: Selected readings (Rev. ed., pp. 121–129). Honolulu, HI: University of Hawaii Press.
 Doi, T. (1986). The anatomy of self: The individual versus society (M. A. Harbison, Trans.). Tokyo: Kodansha International.
 Doi, T. (1989). International Review of Psycho-Analysis, 16, 349-354. 
 Doi, T. (2005). Understanding amae: The Japanese concept of need-love. Kent, UK: Global Oriental.

See also
 
  and 
 Kuki Shūzō

Notes

References
 Dale, Peter N. (1986). The Myth of Japanese Uniqueness Oxford: Nissan Institute, Croom Helm.
 St. Clair, Robert N. (2004).  "The Phenomenology of Self Across Cultures."  Intercultural Communication Studies, 13(3), 8–26.

1920 births
2009 deaths
People associated with the Department of Neuropsychiatry University of Tokyo
Psychoanalysts
People from Tokyo